The Secretariat of State for the Civil Service (Secretaría de Estado de Función Pública, SEFP) is a component of the Spanish Department of Finance and Civil Service responsible for the government policy on General State Administration's civil servants and other policies regarding civil servants of the regional and local administrations. In the past, it also exercised the powers related to e-administration.

The SEFP is integrated by three major departments, the Directorate-General for the Civil Service, the Directorate-General for Public Governance and the Conflicts of Interests Office; and a minor department, the Strategic Planning Office.

History 
The SEFP was created in July 1977 as Secretariat of State for the Public Administration, being one of the first modern Secretariats of State to be created in Spain. In April 2009 it was renamed as Secretariat of State for the Civil Service. The government reform of that year integrated the responsibilities on civil servants in the Ministry of the Presidency, which formerly had the Ministry of Public Administrations through its Secretariat of State for Public Administration. The SEFP was integrated by the secretary of state and the directors-general for the Civil Service, for the Promotion of Electronic Administration, and of Administrative Organization Procedures.

In October 2010, the Ministry of Territorial Policy and Public Administration is recovered and it re-assumes the powers on the civil service by assuming the Secretariat of State. This dependency hardly lasts a year because at the end of 2011 the change of government causes the abolishment of the ministry and the secretariat of state that is integrated into the Ministry of Finance and its powers are transferred to the Secretariat of State for Public Administrations.

The 2016 government reform recovers once again the Secretariat of State for the Civil Service and it increases its powers by adding to its structure the Directorate-General for Public Governance, the Conflicts of Interests Office and the General Secretariat for Digital Administration.

In June 2018, the Ministry of Territorial Policy is recovered and it assumes the Secretariat of State. In 2020, the secretariat of state is abolished and its powers were transferred to the Secretariat of State for Territorial Policy.

In July 2021, the body was recovered.

Officials 
As of 2022, the SEFP officials are:

Agencies 
From the Secretariat of State depends:

 The General Mutual Benefit Society of State Civil Servants.
 The National Institute of Public Administration.
 The Independent Administrative Authority Transparency and Good Governance Council.
 The Institute for the Evaluation of Public Policies.

Budget 
The Secretariat of State for the Civil Service has a budget of €2,042,389,420 for 2022. Most of the budget is destined to defray benefits to state civil servants, through the General Mutual Benefit Society of State Civil Servants (Mutualidad General de Funcionarios Civiles del Estado). According to the 2022 General State Budget, the SEFP participates in six programs:

List of secretaries of state 
The Secretary of State for the Civil Service chairs the Coordination Committee of Inspectorates-General of Services of the ministerial departments, the Open Government Forum and the Sectorial Committee on Open Government. It may also, where appropriate, preside over and by delegation of the Minister responsible, the ICT Strategy Committee.

Since 2009:

 Carmen Gomis Bernal (2009–2010)
 María Consuelo Rumí Ibáñez (2010–2011)
 Elena Collado Martínez (2016–2018)
 José Antonio Benedicto Iruiñ (2018–2020)
Lidia Sánchez Milán (2021–)

References

Public administration
Civil services
Secretaries of State of Spain